Dagur Sigurðsson (born 3 April 1973) is an Icelandic retired handball player and current coach of the Japanese national team. He competed in the 2004 Summer Olympics.

He works as a coach and was the head coach for German side Füchse Berlin, that he led to winning the 2014 DHB Cup. As of 22 August 2017 he is the head coach for the Japanese national team.

References

External links
 
 
 
 

1973 births
Living people
Dagur Sigurdsson
Dagur Sigurdsson
Dagur Sigurdsson
Dagur Sigurdsson
Handball players at the 2004 Summer Olympics
Medalists at the 2016 Summer Olympics
Expatriate handball players
Dagur Sigurdsson
Dagur Sigurdsson
Dagur Sigurdsson
Dagur Sigurdsson
Handball coaches of international teams